Paw Paw High School in Paw Paw, West Virginia serves grades 7 through 12 with approximately 100 students enrolled and over 20 faculty members. It is one of the two high schools in Morgan County along with Berkeley Springs High School in Berkeley Springs.

Paw Paw High School is a part of the Paw Paw Schools complex which also consists of Paw Paw Elementary School. Its principal is Melinda Kasekamp, and the assistant principal is Amber Guthrie.

Notability 
In October 23, 2019, Gov. Jim Justice appeared at Paw Paw High School (Among with Martinsburg South Middle School) to celebrate recent success the school achieved as one of the top-performing schools in West Virginia on the statewide Balanced Scorecard Accountability System.

Sports 
Paw Paw High School's mascot is the pirate.

Paw Paw High School sports include:
 Basketball
 Baseball
 Volleyball
 Cheerleading
 Cross-Country
 Track

Extracurricular activities include Pirate Marching Band, Student Council, and National Honor Society.

Notable alumni 
Josh Delawder, member of the Paw Paw High School Class of 2000, broke the West Virginia State Interscholastic High School Boys Basketball all-time scoring record on February 9, 2000, breaking the record set 52 years before by former Major League Baseball player Paul Popovich who scored 2,660 points at Flemington High from 1955 to 1958. Delawder scored 32 points in a 69–55 win against Mount Savage, MD, and went on to finish his high school career with 2,965 points.

See also
Morgan County Schools
List of high schools in West Virginia
Education in West Virginia

References

External links

Paw Paw
Schools in Morgan County, West Virginia
Public middle schools in West Virginia